WIKQ (103.1 FM) is a radio station broadcasting a country music format. It is licensed to Tusculum, Tennessee, United States, and serves the Tennessee/Virginia Tri-Cities area. The station is owned by Radio Greeneville, Inc.

External links
 WIKQ official website
 

Country radio stations in the United States
IKQ